In the study of stochastic processes, an adapted process (also referred to as a non-anticipating or non-anticipative process) is one that cannot "see into the future". An informal interpretation is that X is adapted if and only if, for every realisation and every n, Xn is known at time n. The concept of an adapted process is essential, for instance, in the definition of the Itō integral, which only makes sense if the integrand is an adapted process.

Definition
Let
  be a probability space;
  be a filtration of the sigma algebra ;
  be a measurable space, the state space;
  be a stochastic process.

The process  is said to be adapted to the filtration  if the random variable  is a -measurable function for each .

Examples
Consider a stochastic process X : [0, T] × Ω → R, and equip the real line R with its usual Borel sigma algebra generated by the open sets.

 If we take the natural filtration F•X, where FtX is the σ-algebra generated by the pre-images  for Borel subsets B of R and times 0 ≤ s ≤ t, then X is automatically F•X-adapted. Intuitively, the natural filtration F•X contains "total information" about the behaviour of X up to time t.
 This offers a simple example of a non-adapted process : set Ft to be the trivial σ-algebra {∅, Ω} for times 0 ≤ t < 1, and Ft = FtX for times . Since the only way that a function can be measurable with respect to the trivial σ-algebra is to be constant, any process X that is non-constant on [0, 1] will fail to be F•-adapted. The non-constant nature of such a process "uses information" from the more refined "future" σ-algebras Ft, .

See also
 Predictable process
 Progressively measurable process

References

Stochastic processes